Aminata Tall (born 1949 in Diourbel) is a politician of the Senegalese Democratic Party (PDS).

Life and career
Tall attended the Girls' Normal Schools of Thiès and Rufisque, where she earned a D-series Baccalauréat. She earned a doctorate in Canada and taught at the École normale supérieure of Dakar.

She was a State Minister, the Minister of Local Authorities and Devolution, also a deputy to the National Assembly and mayor of Diourbel. However, in 2007, she refused her nomination as the deputy chairwoman of the National Assembly and did not join the government of Cheikh Hadjibou Soumaré.

In October 2009, she became the General Secretary of the Presidency of the Republic of Senegal, succeeding Abdoulaye Baldé who was appointed Minister of Armed Forces. She became the chairwoman of the Social and Environmental Economic Council on January 17, 2013.

Bibliography
 
 

20th-century Senegalese women politicians
20th-century Senegalese politicians
21st-century Senegalese women politicians
21st-century Senegalese politicians
Senegalese Democratic Party politicians
Members of the National Assembly (Senegal)
Women government ministers of Senegal
State ministers
Senegalese people
1949 births
Living people